Gary Sedgwick Rice (born 24 August 1960) is a former English cricketer.  Rice was a right-handed batsman who bowled right-arm medium pace.  He was born in Leicester, Leicestershire, the son of Alan Rice who played first-class cricket for Leicestershire.

Rice made his debut for Cambridgeshire in the 1982 Minor Counties Championship against Lincolnshire.  Rice played Minor counties cricket for Cambridgeshire from 1982 to 1988, including nine Minor Counties Championship matches and six MCCA Knockout Trophy matches.  In 1982, he made his List A debut against Warwickshire in the NatWest Trophy.  He played two further List A matches for Cambridgeshire, against Middlesex in 1983 and Warwickshire in 1988.  In his three List A matches, he took 2 wickets at a bowling average of 83.00, with best figures of 1/31.

References

External links
Gary Rice at ESPNcricinfo
Gary Rice at CricketArchive

1960 births
Living people
Cricketers from Leicester
English cricketers
Cambridgeshire cricketers